Kyle Landry (born April 4, 1986) is a Canadian professional basketball player who last played for the Ottawa Blackjacks of the Canadian Elite Basketball League (CEBL). He also represents the senior Canadian national basketball team. He plays the power forward position.

College career
Landry played NCAA Division I college basketball at Northern Arizona University.  He saw extensive action in all four years with the Lumberjacks, and averaged a team-leading 17.5 points and 8.1 rebounds per game, in his senior season (2007–08) for the team.

Professional career
After college, Landry signed with Polish side Sportino Inowrocław. In his only season with the club, 2008–09, he averaged 12.1 points and 10 rebounds per game.  He was named to the All-Polish League First Team and also participated in the league's All-Star Game.  At the end of the season, he signed with Belgian side Dexia Mons-Hainaut for two months and helped the team to a second-place finish in the Basketball League Belgium.

For the 2009–10 season, Landry signed with Prostějov of the Czech National Basketball League. In July 2011, he signed with Triumph Lyubertsy in Russia. He re-signed after the 2013–14 season, and moved with the team to Saint Petersburg, and became a player of the new club Zenit St. Petersburg. In June 2017, he parted ways with Zenit.

On August 1, 2017, Landry signed with the Montenegrin Adriatic League club Budućnost VOLI.

On June 23, 2020, Landry signed with the Ottawa Blackjacks of the Canadian Elite Basketball League (CEBL).

National team career
Landry first played with the senior Canada men's national basketball team at the 2009 Marchand Continental Championship Cup.  At the Marchand Cup, he scored two points, and grabbed seven rebounds, in his only action of the tournament, against Argentina.  He also played with the Canadian senior team at the 2009 FIBA Americas Championship, where he provided support off the bench, for the fourth-place finish Canadians.  With the fourth-place finish, the Canadians qualified for the 2010 FIBA World Championship.

References

External links
EuroCup Profile
FIBA Profile
FIBA Europe Profile
Eurobasket.com Profile

1986 births
Living people
Basketball people from Alberta
BC Zenit Saint Petersburg players
Belfius Mons-Hainaut players
Canadian expatriate basketball people in the United States 
Canadian men's basketball players
Centers (basketball)
Canadian expatriate basketball people in Belgium
Canadian expatriate basketball people in Montenegro
Canadian expatriate basketball people in Poland
Canadian expatriate basketball people in Russia
KK Budućnost players
Northern Arizona Lumberjacks men's basketball players
Power forwards (basketball)
Sportspeople from Calgary